Elizabeth Line (born 7 June 1985) is a British gymnast. She won a silver medal at the 2002 Commonwealth Games. She later competed at the 2004 Summer Olympics.

References

External links
 

1985 births
Living people
British female artistic gymnasts
Olympic gymnasts of Great Britain
Gymnasts at the 2004 Summer Olympics
Sportspeople from Woking
Gymnasts at the 2002 Commonwealth Games
Commonwealth Games silver medallists for England
Commonwealth Games medallists in gymnastics
Medallists at the 2002 Commonwealth Games